Metropolitan Washington Airports Authority v. Citizens for Abatement of Aircraft Noise, Inc., 501 U.S. 252 (1991), was a landmark decision of the Supreme Court of the United States on the United States Constitution's separation of powers doctrine. The Court declared Congress may not vest executive power into agents subject to Congress's control.

See also 
 List of United States Supreme Court cases, volume 501

Notes and references

External links 
 

1991 in United States case law
United States Supreme Court cases
United States Supreme Court cases of the Rehnquist Court
Appointments Clause case law
United States administrative case law
United States separation of powers case law
United States nondelegation doctrine case law